"Evert" is a song written by Eddie Meduza.

Original version and other recordings
The song was originally recorded by Eddie Meduza himself on the 1995 album Harley Davidson. In 1997, the song was recorded by Matz Stefanz med Lailaz on the album Matz-Ztefanz med Lailaz Volym 1.

The Matz-Ztefanz med Lailaz version charted for 22 weeks at the top 10-chart Svensktoppen between 9 August 1997-3 January 1998 before leaving chart.

The original version is sung from an I-perspective ("Jag går på stigen som går till Evert..." = "I walk the path that leads to Evert"), while the  Matz Stefanz med Lailaz version is sung from a we perspective ("Vi går på stigen som går till Evert..." = "we walk the path that leads to Evert").

References 

1995 songs
Swedish-language songs